Beautiful Music for Ugly Children is a young adult novel by Kirstin Cronn-Mills, published October 8, 2012, by North Star Editions. The book tells the story of Gabe, a transgender youth. It received various awards and was a finalist for the Lambda Literary Award for Children's and Young Adult Literature.

When Cronn-Mills was writing the book, she frequently visited RECLAIM, "a Twin Cities-based organization that offers counseling and other services to transsexual [sic] and LGBT youth." Anyone who donated at least ten dollars to the organization received a copy of Beautiful Music for Ugly Children.

Reception 
Beautiful Music for Ugly Children received positive reviews from Booklist, Kirkus Reviews, Publishers Weekly, and School Library Journal.

References 

LGBT young adult literature
Novels with transgender themes
Stonewall Book Award-winning works
2010s LGBT novels
2012 LGBT-related literary works
2012 children's books